The 1799 Vermont gubernatorial election for Governor of Vermont took place throughout September, and resulted in the re-election of Isaac Tichenor to a one-year term.

The Vermont General Assembly met in Windsor on October 10. The Vermont House of Representatives appointed a committee to examine the votes of the freemen of Vermont for governor, lieutenant governor, treasurer, and members of the governor's council.

On October 11, the committee examined the votes, which showed that Isaac Tichenor was chosen for a third one-year term. In the election for lieutenant governor, the voters selected Paul Brigham for a fourth one-year term. The freemen also re-elected Samuel Mattocks as treasurer, his thirteenth one-year term. Vote totals were reported in local newspapers as follows.

Results

References

Vermont gubernatorial elections
gubernatorial
Vermont